Poverty is the scarcity or the lack of certain (variant) material possessions, and may include social, economic, or political elements.

Poverty may also refer to:

Places
Poverty, Kentucky, an unincorporated community
Poverty Bay, a bay on New Zealand's North Island
Poverty Hills, California, a mountain range
Poverty Island, a small island in Lake Michigan

Music
Poverty (rapper) (b. 1978)
Poverty's Paradise, a 1995 album by Naughty By Nature
Two (Poverty),  2007 album by Demiricous

See also
 Poor (disambiguation)